Ruth is a census-designated place (CDP) in Trinity County, California. Ruth  is located in the southern portion of the county. The community - and adjacent Ruth Lake - was named after Ruth McKnight, daughter of settlers. The ZIP code is 95526. The community is inside area code 707. It is located near the headwaters of the Mad River (California) and adjacent to the Yolla Bolly-Middle Eel Wilderness. Its population is 254 as of the 2020 census, up from 195 from the 2010 census.

Geography
According to the United States Census Bureau, the CDP covers an area of 40.5 square miles (104.9 km), 38.8 square miles (100.6 km) of it is land and 1.7 square miles (4.3 km) of it (4.14%) is water.

Demographics
The 2010 United States Census reported that Ruth had a population of 195. The population density was 4.8 people per square mile (1.9/km). The racial makeup of Ruth was 170 (87.2%) White, 0 (0.0%) African American, 9 (4.6%) Native American, 1 (0.5%) Asian, 0 (0.0%) Pacific Islander, 1 (0.5%) from other races, and 14 (7.2%) from two or more races.  Hispanic or Latino of any race were 2 persons (1.0%).

The Census reported that 192 people (98.5% of the population) lived in households, 3 (1.5%) lived in non-institutionalized group quarters, and 0 (0%) were institutionalized.

There were 99 households, out of which 16 (16.2%) had children under the age of 18 living in them, 33 (33.3%) were opposite-sex married couples living together, 10 (10.1%) had a female householder with no husband present, 5 (5.1%) had a male householder with no wife present.  There were 8 (8.1%) unmarried opposite-sex partnerships, and 2 (2.0%) same-sex married couples or partnerships. 42 households (42.4%) were made up of individuals, and 12 (12.1%) had someone living alone who was 65 years of age or older. The average household size was 1.94.  There were 48 families (48.5% of all households); the average family size was 2.56.

The population was spread out, with 24 people (12.3%) under the age of 18, 7 people (3.6%) aged 18 to 24, 34 people (17.4%) aged 25 to 44, 83 people (42.6%) aged 45 to 64, and 47 people (24.1%) who were 65 years of age or older.  The median age was 54.9 years. For every 100 females, there were 97.0 males.  For every 100 females age 18 and over, there were 94.3 males.

There were 315 housing units at an average density of 7.8 per square mile (3.0/km), of which 73 (73.7%) were owner-occupied, and 26 (26.3%) were occupied by renters. The homeowner vacancy rate was 2.7%; the rental vacancy rate was 3.7%.  150 people (76.9% of the population) lived in owner-occupied housing units and 42 people (21.5%) lived in rental housing units.

Politics

References

Census-designated places in Trinity County, California
Census-designated places in California